Antarctospira badenpowelli is a species of sea snail, a marine gastropod mollusk in the family Borsoniidae.

Description
The length of the shell varies between 7 mm and 20 mm.

Distribution
This species occurs off the Beauchene Island, Falkland Islands, in the South Atlantic Ocean; in the McMurdo Sound, Ross Sea, Antarctica

References

 Dell, R. K. (1990). Antarctic Mollusca with special reference to the fauna of the Ross Sea. Bulletin of the Royal Society of New Zealand, Wellington 27: 1–311 page(s): 224, figs 393, 410

External links
 Kantor Y.I., Harasewych M.G. & Puillandre N. (2016). A critical review of Antarctic Conoidea (Neogastropoda). Molluscan Research. 36(3): 153-206
 
 Gastropods.com: Leucosyrinx badenpowelli

badenpowelli
Gastropods described in 1990